The Convocation of Episcopal Churches in Europe (formerly the Convocation of American Churches in Europe) is a jurisdiction of the Episcopal Church created in 1859 by an action of its general convention. The convocation includes all Episcopal congregations in continental Europe. Along with dioceses in New York, New Jersey, Haiti, Cuba, and the Virgin Islands it belongs to Province II of the Episcopal Church.

The Presiding Bishop of the Episcopal Church has jurisdiction over the convocation but oversight is delegated to a bishop in charge. On April 6, 2019, Mark Edington succeeded the Right Reverend Pierre W. Whalon as bishop in charge, in a consecration and installation ceremony presided over by the presiding bishop, the Most Reverend Michael Curry, at the American Cathedral of the Holy Trinity in Paris.

The convocation currently has an institutional presence in seven European countries: Austria, Belgium, France, Germany, Italy, Switzerland, and Georgia.

Parishes 
There are nine parishes and numerous missions, with a total of 2,543 baptized members (2018). The parishes are located in Belgium, Germany, France, Italy, and Switzerland.

Belgium
All Saints', Waterloo

France
Cathedral of the Holy Trinity, Paris
Christ Church, Clermont-Ferrand

Germany
Christ the King, Frankfurt am Main
Church of the Ascension, Munich
Church of St Augustine of Canterbury, Wiesbaden

Italy
St. James', Florence
St. Paul's Within the Walls, Rome

Switzerland
 Emmanuel Church, Geneva

Missions and other institutions 
There are also groups known as "missionary congregations" that are not yet full parishes as well as other institutions connected to the convocation. These are located in Austria, Belgium, France, Germany,  Italy, and Georgia.

Austria

Marriage Retreat Kapelle, Mühlbach am Hochkönig

Belgium 

 Christ Church, Charleroi
 St. Esprit, Mons
 St Servais, Namur

France

Grace Anglican Episcopal Church in the Hérault, Montpellier

Germany
St. James the Less, Nuremberg 
St. Boniface, Augsburg
St. Columban's, Karlsruhe
St. Michael’s Church, Thuringia: Weimar

Italy 

 Congregacion Latinoamericana - Iglesia San Pablo Dentro de los Muros de Roma - Spanish language ministry in Rome
 Church of the Resurrection, Orvieto - Italian and English ministry
 Italian Language Ministry
 Gesú Buon Pastore, Milan - Mission
 Joel Nafuma Refugee Center, Rome
 Santa Maria a Ferrano - retreat center near Florence

Georgia 
 St. Nino, Tbilisi

Bishops 
Various people have held the title of bishop-in-charge of the convocation before the current bishop, Mark David Wheeler Edington. His immediate predecessor was Pierre Whalon.

 1916-1923: G. Mott Williams
 1971-1974: Edmond Browning
 1978-1980: Richard Millard
 1980-1984: John McGill Krumm
 1986–1989: Donald Davies
 1988-1993: Matthew P. Bigliardi
 1994-2001: Jeffery Rowthorn
 2001-2019: Pierre Whalon
 Since April 6, 2019 Mark David Wheeler Edington
Mark D .W. Edington of the Diocese of Massachusetts was elected Bishop in Charge of the Convocation of Episcopal Churches in Europe in October 2018. Presiding Bishop Michael Curry ordained and consecrated him on April 6, 2019, at the American Cathedral of the Holy Trinity in Paris.

See also
 Diocese of Gibraltar in Europe - the Church of England's diocese in Europe

References

External links

 

1859 establishments in Europe
Anglican dioceses established in the 19th century
Anglicanism in Europe
Anglo-Catholicism
Europe
Episcopal Church (United States)
Religious organizations established in 1859
Province 2 of the Episcopal Church (United States)